In biology, a taxon with a disjunct distribution is one that has two or more groups that are related but considerably separated from each other geographically. The causes are varied and might demonstrate either the expansion or contraction of a species' range.

Range fragmentation
Also called range fragmentation, disjunct distributions may be caused by changes in the environment, such as mountain building and continental drift or rising sea levels; it may also be due to an organism expanding its range into new areas, by such means as rafting, or other animals transporting an organism to a new location (plant seeds consumed by birds and animals can be moved to new locations during bird or animal migrations, and those seeds can be deposited in new locations in fecal matter). Other conditions that can produce disjunct distributions include: flooding, or changes in wind, stream, and current flows, plus others such as anthropogenic introduction of alien introduced species either accidentally or deliberately (agriculture and horticulture).

Habitat fragmentation
Disjunct distributions can occur when suitable habitat is fragmented, which produces fragmented populations, and when that fragmentation becomes so divergent that species movement between one suitable habitat to the next is disrupted, isolated population can be produced. Extinctions can cause disjunct distribution, especially in areas where only scattered areas are habitable by a species; for instance, island chains or specific elevations along a mountain range or areas along a coast or between bodies of water like streams, lakes and ponds.

Examples
There are many patterns of disjunct distributions at many scales: Irano-Turanian disjunction, Europe - East Asia, Europe-South Africa (e.g. genus Erica), Mediterranean-Hoggart disjunction (genus Olea), etc.

Lusitanian distribution

This kind of disjunct distribution of a species, such that it occurs in Iberia and in Ireland, without any intermediate localities, is usually called "Lusitanian" (named after the Roman Province Lusitania, corresponding roughly to modern-day Portugal).

Examples of animal species with a Lusitanian distribution are: the Kerry slug Geomalacus maculosus and the Pyrenean glass snail Semilimax pyrenaicus. Plant species with this kind of distribution include several heather species (Calluna spp.) and the strawberry tree (Arbutus unedo).

The theory behind the name "Lusitanian" is now discredited; it posited that there was an ice-free land mass that served as a refugium off of the south-west of Ireland during the Quaternary (last) glaciation. In this refugium, relic fauna and flora from a previous ice-free period survived until the present warmer interstadial period. Although the theory is no longer accepted, the term Lusitanian is still used as a descriptive term for faunal elements such as the Kerry slug.
 
Recently a better explanation of the occurrence of the Kerry slug and similar faunal elements in southwestern Ireland has been developed. This new theory is supported by two recent discoveries: the genetic similarity of much of Ireland's fauna to that of northern Spain, and the genetic similarity of much of Ireland's human population to that of northern Spain.

Mascheretti et al. (2003) examined the genotypes of Eurasian pygmy shrew, a small mammal, across its range in Europe. The Irish population showed close genetic affinity to a population from Andorra but not to that of Britain or other places in Europe. The genetic structure of the population further showed that the entire Irish population of the Eurasian pygmy shrew had originated from a single founder event. The authors concluded that it had been introduced in the early (Palaeolithic) or middle (Mesolithic) Stone Age, by boat, probably from south-west Europe. This coincides with work on human populations, which found a strong genetic similarity in make-up between populations in western Ireland and in northern Spain. This would be explained by a human migration from Spain to Ireland in the late Paleolithic or early Mesolithic.

It seems increasingly likely that much of Ireland's Lusitanian fauna is in reality an artefact of this era of human expansion in the early part of the Postglacial era. In other words, it seems likely that these species were introduced accidentally with trade items or goods brought by boat from Iberia.

See also
Geographical isolation
Habitat
Habitat fragmentation

References

Biogeography
Biology terminology
Habitat
Ecology terminology